The Eurovision Young Dancers 2005 was the eleventh edition of the Eurovision Young Dancers, held at the National Theatre in Warsaw, Poland on 24 June 2005. Organised by the European Broadcasting Union (EBU) and host broadcaster Telewizja Polska (TVP), dancers from ten countries participated in the televised final. A total of thirteen countries took part in the competition. For this contest, a week of dance master classes replaced the semi-final round in order to select the finalists.

Milou Nuyens of Netherlands won the contest, with host country Poland and Belgium placing second and third respectively.

Location

National Theatre, Warsaw in Poland was the host venue for the 2005 edition of the Eurovision Young Dancers.

It was founded in 1765, during the Polish Enlightenment, by that country's last monarch, Stanisław August Poniatowski. The theatre shares the Grand Theatre complex at the Theatre Square in Warsaw with another national venue, the Poland's National Opera.

Format
The format consists of dancers who are non-professional and between the ages of 16–21, competing in a performance of dance routines of their choice, which they have prepared in advance of the competition. All the acts then take part in a choreographed group dance during 'Young Dancers Week'.

Jury members of a professional aspect and representing the elements of ballet, contemporary, and modern dancing styles, score each of the competing individual and group dance routines. The overall winner upon completion of the final dances is chosen by the professional jury members.

Ocelot - Acrobatic Dance Theatre performed as the interval act.

Results

Preliminary round
The semi-final round was replaced by a week of dance master classes. Florence Clerc, Irek Mukhamedow, Christopher Bruce and Piotr Nardelli were the dance teachers selected to work with the participants and choose the 10 finalists. The following countries failed to qualify.

Final
Awards were given to the top three countries. The table below highlights these using gold, silver, and bronze. The placing results of the remaining participants is unknown and never made public by the European Broadcasting Union.

Choreography: Mateusz Polit

Jury members 
The jury members consisted of the following:

  – Maya Plisetskaya (Honorary Head of the Jury)
  – Irek Mukhamedov (President of the Jury)
  – Krzysztof Pastor
  – Gigi Caciuelanu 
  – Jorma Uotinen
  – Emil Wesolowski

Broadcasting
The 2005 Young Dancers competition was broadcast in at least 13 countries.

See also
 Eurovision Song Contest 2005
 Junior Eurovision Song Contest 2005

References

External links 
 

Eurovision Young Dancers by year
2005 in Poland
June 2005 events in Europe
Events in Warsaw